China CITIC Bank is China's seventh-largest lender in terms of total assets. It was known as CITIC Industrial Bank until it changed its name in August 2005. China CITIC Bank, established in 1987, is a nationally comprehensive and internationally oriented commercial bank. The bank operates in Hong Kong, Macau, New York, Los Angeles, Singapore and London, and maintains a strong foothold on the mainland banking industry. The bank operates 163 branches in the mainland, and 1,252 sub-branches, located in economically developed regions of China. In total, there are 1,415 branch offices in China, as of Q4 2021.

History

Origins
In 1984, the chairman of CITIC group at the time, Rong Yiren (荣毅仁), requested that the Chinese government create a banking division under his company, in order to fully embody the needs for foreign exchange. This move was approved by the People's Bank of China, and a banking division was created under CITIC group in April 1985. At this point, the bank was based on the original finance department, expanding its operations regarding external financing, foreign exchange transactions, loans, international settlement, finance leases and deposits. In April 1987, the bank was formally established as a separate legal entity, following approval from the People's Bank of China and the Chinese State Council.

2000-present
China CITIC Bank's businesses flourished in the first decade of the 21st century. In July 2000, CITIC bank became the first bank in China to be certified by the China Financial Certificate Authority for online banking. In July 2002, the bank improved its international standing by ranking 291st on the "Top 1000 World Banks" list released by The Banker magazine of the United Kingdom, ranking within the top 300 for the first time. In November 2006, the bank welcomed its first major foreign investment, when BBVA, the second largest bank in Spain, became a major shareholder. This move established a co-operative relationship. On 27 April 2007, China CITIC Bank was listed on the Hong Kong and Shanghai stock exchanges.

In May 2017 the A share of the company was removed from the constituents of SSE 50 Index; it remained in SSE 180 Index.

Banking achievements and facts
Ranked the 185th among the top 500 enterprises by market value in 2010 by the Financial Times.
Among the “Top 1000 World Banks” released by The Banker magazine of the UK, China CITIC Bank ranked 67th in the world in terms of tier-1 capital and 72nd in terms of total assets.
Currently the seventh largest bank in China.
A wholly owned subsidiary of China International Trust and Investment Corporation (CITIC), with assets of RMB 576 billion (US$71 billion).
First bank in China to be certified by the China Financial Certificate Authority for online banking.

Bank services
Being a local commercial bank, China CITIC bank currently offers a large range of services, including:

Personal finance
Retailing banking, credit card, band card services, wealth management, private banking, savings, personal loans, financial services abroad and electronic banking services.

Corporate banking
Financial organization services, international business, investment banking, supply chain financing, account settlement, financing services for small enterprises, trading services, cash management, asset management, international settlement and trade financing, capital market business, including foreign exchange businesses, bond businesses, trading of financing and derivative products, financial service platforms and financial solutions.

References

Companies in the CSI 100 Index
Former companies in the SSE 50 Index
Banks of China
CITIC Group
Banks established in 1987
Chinese companies established in 1987
Chinese brands
Multinational companies headquartered in China
Companies listed on the Hong Kong Stock Exchange
Companies listed on the Shanghai Stock Exchange
H shares